The Western Cape Water Supply System (WCWSS) is a complex water supply system in the Western Cape region of South Africa, comprising an inter-linked system of six main dams, pipelines, tunnels and distribution networks, and a number of minor dams, some owned and operated by the Department of Water and Sanitation and some by the City of Cape Town.

Components
The largest component of the WCWSS is the Riviersonderend-Berg River Government Water Scheme, which is a large inter-basin water transfer scheme that regulates the flow of the Sonderend River flowing South towards the Indian Ocean, the Berg River flowing North towards the Atlantic Ocean and Eerste River that flows into False Bay.

The principal dams are all located in the Cape Fold Mountains to the east of Cape Town. They are:

 Theewaterskloof Dam
 Wemmershoek Dam
 Steenbras Lower Dam
 Steenbras Upper Dam
 Voëlvlei Dam
 Berg River Dam

These six major dams provide 99.6% of the combined storage capacity, and 8 minor dams the remaining 0.4%. The levels of these dams are recorded and published in weekly reports by the Department of Water and Sanitation.

The largest dam in the system is the Theewaterskloof Dam on the Sonderend River, with a storage capacity of 480 million cubic meters, or 41% of the total storage. It is linked to the Cape Town water system through the Faure treatment works via the Kleinplass balancing dam with a tunnel system through the Hottentots Holland Mountains. The Berg River dam (130 million cubic meter) was added to this system in 2009.

Other storage dams of the WCWSS are the Voëlvlei Dam (159 million cubic meters), the Wemmershoek Dam (59 million cubic meter) in the Berg River basin, the Upper and Lower Steenbras Dams on the Steenbras River as well as the Palmiet Pumped Storage Scheme dams on the Palmiet River, from which water can be transferred to the Steenbras dams.

In 2009 storage capacity in the system was increased by 17% from 768 to 898 million cubic metres through the completion of the Berg River Dam.

Water use
In 2009, 63% of the water in the system was being used for domestic and industrial purposes in the city of Cape Town, which has a population of over 4 million. Smaller towns used 5%, and 32% was used by agriculture. Within the city, in 2016/2017, 64.5% of water went to houses, flats and complexes, while 3.6% went to informal settlements.

The system provides water to irrigate about 15,000ha of farmland, where high-value fruit and vegetables are grown. From the early 1970s until the mid-2000s water consumption in Cape Town increased by about 300%, increasing the competition for water with irrigated agriculture. This has been exacerbated by several unusually dry years, such as in 1994-1995 when storage in the system was only one third of average storage. Farmers have adapted by significantly improving irrigation efficiency and shifting even more land into the production of high-value crops.

The system also generates pumped storage hydropower using an installed capacity of 400 Megawatt (MW) on the Palmiet River and 180MW on the Steenbras River.

Water crisis 2015-present

See also
 Water supply and sanitation in South Africa
 Water Board (South Africa)
 Department of Water and Sanitation

References

Water supply and sanitation in South Africa